Icaria  is a genus of eusocial paper wasps in the Ropalidiini tribe, which was later synonymized to Ropalidia Guérin-Méneville. The former genus contained, among other, the following species:
 Icaria africana (Cameron, 1910)
 Icaria artifex (Smith, 1871)
 Icaria cariniscutis Cameron, 1910
 Icaria cayayanensis Ashmead, 1905
 Icaria fasciata Smith, 1858
 Icaria ferruginea Horne, ???
 Icaria kohni Buysson, 1909
 Icaria pruinosa Cameron 1906
 Icaria xanthopoda Cameron, 1902

Enemy species
An enemy of Icaria is the Vespa tropicalis (=V. deusta), which will invade and rob Icaria nests.

References

Vespidae